Richard Peter Brancatisano (born 29 October 1983), also known by his stage name Richie Branco, is an Australian television actor and musician, best known for his roles as Xander Bly, the Green Mystic Ranger, in Power Rangers: Mystic Force and Dominic Russo on the ABC Family drama series, Chasing Life. He released his debut single "Fight Me" on 10 July 2018.

Life and career
Brancatisano was born in Sydney, in Australia, to an Italian father and an Australian mother.  His interest in the dramatic arts began at an early age, and he appeared in several musicals and plays at his high school, The King's School in Parramatta.

Before appearing in Power Rangers, Richard performed as Corey in the 2005 season of Boyband: The Musical, put on by Ricochet Working Productions, an Australian theatre company, and in the theatre production "Vin," as the lead character, Vin. He studied for three years at Theatre Nepean and continues to work, both as an actor and musician, nationally and internationally.

In the Australian theatre and music circles, he is also known as "Richie Branco". He was touring with New Zealand Artist (Gin Wigmore).

He appears in the international children's TV series The Elephant Princess (season 2) as Caleb and in Home and Away as Prince Vittorio Secca.

He is the main protagonist in the hit Australian stage play, turned to big screen sensation, Alex & Eve 2015, written by Alex Lykos. A modern take on Romeo and Juliet and likened to My Big Fat Greek Wedding but taken to the next level, the synchronous multicultural dating landscape between a Greek Orthodox Alex and a Muslim Lebanese, Eve, played by Andrea Demetriades, and also stars Tony Nikolakopoulos, Zoe Carides and George Kapiniaris.

Filmography

Film

Television

Theatre

Public appearances
Richard was one of the guests of the Power Morphicon, the first Power Rangers convention, at Los Angeles in June 2007 and August 2014.

References

External links

1983 births
Australian male television actors
Australian people of Italian descent
Living people
People from New South Wales